Gymnoclytia dubia is a North American species of tachinid flies in the genus Gymnoclytia of the family Tachinidae.

Hosts
Larvae have been recorded from Cosmopepla bimaculata (Hemiptera)

Distribution
Manitoba to Nova Scotia, south to Virginia, California, British Columbia & Texas

References

External links
 Taxonomic & Host Catalogue of the Tachinidae of America North of Mexico

Phasiinae
Diptera of North America
Insects described in 1925